"I Live My Life for You" is the seventh single released by the American rock band FireHouse. A power ballad, the song reached number 26 on the Billboard Hot 100 and number 20 on the Adult Contemporary charts. It is generally considered to be the last song released by a 1980s style glam metal band still classified as such to make a significant impact on the charts, something notable because it was released in 1995 which was a full three years after the genre was pushed out of the mainstream by the grunge movement. The song was written by guitarist Bill Leverty and vocalist C.J. Snare.

When asked about the song's success in an interview, Snare commented that "we surprised a lot of people because we were the only band of that genre that I can remember that actually had a top 20 hit right in the middle of that whole Seattle scene."

Charts

Year-end chart

References

External links
Music Video for "I Live My Life for You"

FireHouse (band) songs
1995 songs
1995 singles
Glam metal ballads
Song recordings produced by Ron Nevison
Songs written by Bill Leverty
Songs written by C. J. Snare
Epic Records singles